Georg Christian Unger (25 May 1743 – 20 February 1799) was a German architect who was a pupil of the architect Carl von Gontard and served Frederick II of Prussia. Among his works were the Brandenburg Gate in Potsdam and the Gendarmenmarkt in Berlin.

References

Further reading
 Wendland, Christian. Georg Christian Unger: Baumeister Friedrichs des Grossen in Potsdam und Berlin (J. Strauss, 2002)

External links 

18th-century German architects
1743 births
1799 deaths